Zhengtong (18 January 1436 – 13 January 1450) was the era name used by Emperor Yingzong, the sixth emperor of the Ming dynasty of China, after he ascended the throne for the first time. It was used for a total of 14 years.

On 1 September 1449 (Zhengtong 14, 15th day of the  8th month), Emperor Yingzong was captured at the Tumu Crisis. On 6 September (6th day of the 9th month), the Jingtai Emperor ascended to the throne and continued to use. The era was changed to Jingtai in the following year.

Comparison table

Other regime era names that existed during the same period
 China
 Taiding (泰定, 1448–1449): Ming period — era name of Chen Jianhu (陳鑑胡)
 Dongyang (東陽, 1449–1450): Ming period — era name of Huang Xiaoyang (黃蕭養)
 Vietnam
 Thiệu Bình (紹平, 1434–1439): Later Lê dynasty — era name of Lê Thái Tông
 Đại Bảo (大寶, 1440–1442): Later Lê dynasty — era name of Lê Thái Tông
 Đại Hòa (大和) or Thái Hòa (太和) (1443–1453): Later Lê dynasty — era name of Lê Nhân Tông
 Japan
 Eikyō (永享, 1429–1441): era name of Emperor Go-Hanazono
 Kakitsu (嘉吉, 1441–1444): era name of Emperor Go-Hanazono
 Bun'an (文安, 1444–1449): era name of Emperor Go-Hanazono
 Hōtoku (宝徳, 1449–1452): era name of Emperor Go-Hanazono

See also
 List of Chinese era names
 List of Ming dynasty era names

References

Further reading

Ming dynasty eras